The UK Albums Chart is a weekly record chart based on album sales from Sunday to Saturday in the United Kingdom; during the 2000s, a total of 274 different albums by 170 artists reached number one. The chart was compiled weekly by the Official Charts Company (OCC) on behalf of the British music industry—it listed only physical album sales until 2007, after which it also included albums sold digitally. The OCC defined an "album" to be any music release that featured more than four tracks or lasted longer than 25 minutes. Each week's new number one was first announced on Sunday evenings by BBC Radio 1 on their weekly chart show.

The most successful albums during the 2000s were Life for Rent by Dido and Back to Bedlam by James Blunt. Released in 2003 and 2004 respectively, each spent ten weeks at number one—Back to Bedlam was also the biggest-selling album of the decade. Dido and Blunt also topped the chart with one other album each. Irish boy band Westlife reached number one with seven different releases, the most of any act. British singer Robbie Williams released six number one albums, which spent a total of 23 weeks on the top of the chart, longer than any other artist—by 2005, Williams had sold more albums during the 2000s than any other act.

The most successful record label during this period was Polydor Records—benefitting from strong sales from artists such as Ronan Keating, Scissor Sisters and Take That, Polydor topped the chart with 13 different albums which spent 33 weeks at number one, longer than any other company. Columbia Records released 17 albums that reached number one, the most of any label; its artists roster featured Barbra Streisand and Bruce Springsteen. In August 2003, Magic and Medicine by The Coral became the 700th album to top the UK chart—fewer than four years later, Not Too Late by Norah Jones became the 800th album to do so.

Following its significantly increased popularity in the early 21st century, reality television began to have a significant impact on the British music industry. Of the 274 albums that reached number one in the UK charts, 15 were by artists that had found fame through a reality TV programme. The first such act was Hear'Say, a British pop group formed by the television show Popstars. In March 2001, their debut album Popstars topped the chart and became the fastest-selling debut in UK chart history to that date. The only reality television stars to top the album chart with two different releases were Will Young, the 2002 winner of Pop Idol, Girls Aloud, the girl group formed by the TV series Popstars: The Rivals, and Leona Lewis, the 2006 winner of The X Factor. Like Hear'Say, Lewis's first album Spirit broke the record for the fastest-selling debut in UK chart history.

Number ones

By artist

Eight artists spent 10 weeks or more at number one on the album chart during the 2000s.

By record label
Eight record labels spent 20 weeks or more at number one on the album chart during the 2000s.

Christmas number ones

In the UK, Christmas number one albums are those that are at the top of the UK Albums Chart on Christmas Day. Typically, this will refer to the album that was announced as number one on the Sunday before 25 December—when Christmas Day falls on a Sunday itself, the official number one is considered by the OCC to be the one announced on that day's chart. During the 2000s, the following albums were Christmas number ones.

See also
List of UK Album Downloads Chart number ones of the 2000s
List of UK Compilation Chart number ones of the 2000s

Notes

References

External links
Official UK Albums Top 100 at the Official Charts Company
The Official UK Top 40 Albums Chart at BBC Radio 1

2000s in British music
United Kingdom Albums
2000s